So Much (for) Stardust is the upcoming eighth studio album by American rock band Fall Out Boy. The album is set to be released on March 24, 2023 on Fueled by Ramen and DCD2. The album reunites the band with producer Neal Avron, who last produced Folie à Deux (2008), and also marks the band's return to their original record label Fueled By Ramen, which last released Take This to Your Grave (2003). The first single from the album, "Love from the Other Side", released on January 18, 2023 alongside the official announcement of the album.

Background 
After receiving mixed reviews for their 2018 album, Mania, the band went silent on new music, besides releasing a second greatest hits album in 2019. 

Vocalist Patrick Stump discussed the album's creation:

 Due to the band’s album deal with Island Records ending, the band signed with Fueled by Ramen and Elektra Records for the album's release, marking their first release under Fueled by Ramen since Take This to Your Grave. It was also announced that the album was produced by Neal Avron, making it the first time Fall Out Boy had worked with him since Folie à Deux.

On the same day of the single release and album announcement, guitarist Joe Trohman announced on social media that he would be taking a break from the band to focus on his mental health.

On March 3, 2023, the album's tracklist was confirmed.

On March 13, the band announced that "Hold Me Like a Grudge" would be the next single of the album. On March 15, a clip of the song was shared.

Composition 
The album marks a return to a more guitar-driven sound. However, Stump maintains that "it’s not a throwback record" but rather an imagining of "what would it have sounded like if we had made a record right after Folie à Deux instead of taking a break for a few years. It was like exploring the multiverse. It was an experiment in seeing what we would have done."

Promotion

Singles
In December 2022, the band released a claymation animation homage, and began teasing a new song. The band made a website called sendingmylovefromtheotherside.com. On January 10, 2023, Oliver Sykes of Bring Me the Horizon posted to his Instagram story that he had received a package in the mail from Fall Out Boy containing a pink seashell labeled 1 of 13 alongside a letter with the date January 18, 2023, and the song title "Love From The Other Side". The lead single, "Love from the Other Side", was announced on January 11, 2023. The song was released on January 18, alongside the band confirming the album title and setting the release date for March 24, 2023.

Since then, the band has posted a photo of another package with a set of coordinates leading to the Field of Dreams Movie Site in Dyersville, Iowa. The package contained another seashell marked 2 of 13 with a letter, this time printed was the date January 25, 2023, and a speculated song title "Heartbreak Feels So Good". On January 23, 2023, the band announced the next single, "Heartbreak Feels So Good", released on January 25, 2023, with promotion featuring actress Nicole Kidman's advertisements for AMC Theatres. A third package was left outside Wrigley Field in Chicago, Illinois.

TV performances
The band performed "Love from the Other Side" on Jimmy Kimmel Live! the same day it was released. The band performed "Heartbreak Feels So Good" on Jimmy Kimmel Live! on January 31, 2023.

Tour
On January 31, 2023, the band announced their first solo headlining tour since 2019, So Much For (Tour) Dust, with 30 dates across North America. The band will be joined by Bring Me the Horizon, with Alkaline Trio, New Found Glory, Four Year Strong, The Academy Is…, Royal & the Serpent, Games We Play, Daisy Grenade, and Carr appearing for select dates. It is currently unknown if Joe Trohman will tour with the band, due to his temporary hiatus.

The tour is scheduled to begin on June 21, 2023 at Chicago’s Wrigley Field and will end on November 9 at Max-Schmeling-Halle in Berlin.

Track listing

References

2023 albums
Fall Out Boy albums
Fueled by Ramen albums
Upcoming albums